Mohamed bin Abdul Rahman (born 1935) is a Malaysian sprinter. He competed in the men's 4 × 400 metres relay at the 1964 Summer Olympics.

References

1935 births
Living people
Athletes (track and field) at the 1964 Summer Olympics
Malaysian male sprinters
Olympic athletes of Malaysia
Place of birth missing (living people)
Athletes (track and field) at the 1962 Asian Games
Asian Games competitors for Malaysia